Mazsalaca Parish is an administrative unit of Valmiera Municipality in the Vidzeme region of Latvia. It was created in 2010 from the countryside territory of Mazsalaca town. At the beginning of 2014, the population of the parish was 650.

Towns, villages and settlements of Mazsalaca parish 
 Blāķi
 Blanka
 Parkmaļi
 Priedāji
 Promulti
 Tīši
 Unguri

References

External links 
 

Parishes of Latvia
Valmiera Municipality
Vidzeme